The 2011 Promotional League Final, the third Promotional League Final, was held in Barcelona, Spain, on September 25, 2011 at 3:30 pm during the 2011 CSIO Barcelona (CSIO 5*). It was the 100th time a horse show is held at Barcelona, first time in 1902. A purse of € 90,000 was offered at the Promotional League Final, with each of the seven competing teams receiving a share.

Qualified and competing teams 
The qualified teams of the 2011 Promotional League Final was:
 from Western and Middle Europe and some other regions without own Promotional League (The second-placed to fourth-placed nations of the European Promotional League):
 
 
 
 from Eastern Europe and some other regions without own Promotional League (The first placed to third-placed nations of the Challengers League):
 
 
 
 from America (the best-placed nation of the North and South American League):
 

The team of Turkey didn't start in the 2011 Promotional League Final. Because they didn't start,  (fifth-placed nation of the Challengers League) had the chance to start in the final.

Result 
The best-placed team of this competition, Sweden, move into the 2012 FEI Nations Cup. Also Switzerland was promoted to the 2012 FEI Nations Cup because of their victory in the 2011 European Promotional League (best team after six competitions).

References 
 2011 rules FEI Nations Cup and FEI Nations Cup Promotional Leagues

External links 
 Timetable 2011 CSIO Barcelona
 2011 results CSIO Barcelona

Promotional League Final
Sports competitions in Barcelona
2011 in Spanish sport
Equestrian sports competitions in Spain